Lagos is a Portuguese wine region centered on the Lagos municipality in the Algarve region. The region has Portugal's highest wine classification as a Denominação de Origem Controlada (DOC). Located on the southwestern corner of Algarve, the region is bordered to the east by the Portimão DOC.

Grapes
The principle grapes of the Lagos region includes Boal, Negra Mole and Periquita.

See also
List of Portuguese wine regions

References

Wine regions of Portugal
Portuguese products with protected designation of origin
Lagos, Portugal